Proserpina is a genus of small land snails, terrestrial gastropod mollusks in the family Proserpinidae.

Proserpina is the type genus of the family Proserpinidae.

Distribution 
Distribution of the genus Proserpina include Cuba
and Jamaica
.

Species
Species within the genus Proserpina include:

Proserpina bidentata C. B. Adams, 1850
 Proserpina depressa (d’Orbigny, 1842)
 Proserpina globulosa (d’Orbigny, 1842)
Proserpina infortunata
Proserpina linguifera (Jonas, 1839)
  † Proserpina milleri (Fulton, 1915)
Proserpina nitida Sowerby II, 1839
Proserpina pisum C. B. Adams, 1850
Proserpina planior
Proserpina scudderae Thompson, 1980

References

 Bank, R. (2017). Classification of the Recent terrestrial Gastropoda of the World. Last update: July 16, 2017

External links
 Newton R. B. (1891). Systematic list of the F. E. Edwards collection of British Oligocene and Eocene mollusca in the British Museum (Natural History), with references to the type-specimens from similar horizons contained in other collections belonging to the Geological Department of the Museum. London, British Museum, XXVIII + 365 pp
 Bouchet P., Rocroi J.P., Hausdorf B., Kaim A., Kano Y., Nützel A., Parkhaev P., Schrödl M. & Strong E.E. (2017). Revised classification, nomenclator and typification of gastropod and monoplacophoran families. Malacologia. 61(1-2): 1-526. note: type species fixation

Proserpinidae